The Morten Village is a historical traditional Malay village in Melaka City, Melaka, Malaysia.

Naming
The village is named after a British land revenue collector during the British Malaya, Frederick Joseph Morten.

History
The area used to be a quiet place during the 1960s and 1970s. The area was then evolved to become a tourist attraction since it was declared a heritage village under Malacca's Preservation and Conservation Enactment in 1989.

Architecture
The village houses more than 100 traditional Malay houses.

Tourist attractions
 Villa Sentosa

See also
 List of tourist attractions in Malacca

References

Malacca City
Villages in Malacca